The 11th Emmy Awards, later referred to as the 11th Primetime Emmy Awards, were held on May 6, 1959, to honor the best in television of the year. The ceremony was held at  the Moulin Rouge Nightclub in Hollywood, California. It was hosted by Raymond Burr. All nominations are listed, with winners in bold and series' networks are in parentheses.

For the first time in Emmy history, all major categories were split into genre-specific fields, this would become standard for later ceremonies. The top show of the night was the NBC special, An Evening with Fred Astaire, it tied the record of five major wins. Father Knows Best also set a milestone, becoming the first show to be nominated in every major category (series, writing, directing, and the four major acting categories).

Winners and nominees
Winners are listed first, highlighted in boldface, and indicated with a double dagger (‡).

Programs

Acting

Lead performances

Supporting performances

Single performances

Directing

Writing

Most major nominations
By network 
 CBS – 69
 NBC – 57
 ABC – 16

 By program
 Playhouse 90 (CBS) – 9
 Father Knows Best (NBC) / Peter Gunn (NBC) – 7
 Alcoa-Goodyear Theatre (NBC) / The Bob Cummings Show (NBC) / An Evening with Fred Astaire (NBC)Hallmark Hall of Fame (NBC) / The Phil Silvers Show (CBS) / The Real McCoys (ABC) – 5
 General Electric Theatre (CBS) / Gunsmoke (CBS)  / The Jack Benny Show (CBS) / The Steve Allen Show (NBC) – 4

Most major awards
By network 
 NBC – 19
 CBS – 10
 ABC – 1

 By program
 An Evening with Fred Astaire (NBC)  – 5
 Alcoa-Goodyear Theatre (NBC) / Hallmark Hall of Fame (NBC) / The Jack Benny Show (CBS) – 3
 The Dinah Shore Chevy Show (NBC) / Father Knows Best (CBS) / Perry Mason (CBS) – 2

Notes

References

External links
 Emmys.com list of 1959 Nominees & Winners
 

011
Primetime Emmy Awards 
Primetime Emmy Awards
Primetime Emmy Awards
Primetime Emmy Awards
Primetime Emmy Awards